The Channel was a music venue located in Boston, Massachusetts, that was part of the underground arts community of South Boston.

History
Joe Cicerone, Harry Booras and Rich Clements founded The Channel in 1980, choosing the name because the club sat at the edge of the Fort Point Channel, which separates South Boston from the Financial District. The club was on the other side and a little south of where the Boston Tea Party took place (old Griffin's Wharf) in 1773. Cicerone's involvement in the club would be short lived and he would soon be replaced by Jack Burke. Burke and Harry Booras along with Peter Booras as General Manager would run The Channel throughout its heyday of the 1980s. In 1990, Harry and Peter Booras, the last owners of the club, filed for chapter 11. The authorities had revoked the liquor license several times with fines for serving minors. The doors closed on December 31, 1991. There were rumors that mob boss Frank Salemme had a foothold in the club, and these rumors proliferated after The Channel reopened its doors as an exotic dance club, which closed after less than a year. His son, Frank Salemme Jr., was listed for a time as the assistant manager of the club. In the late 1990s, developers demolished the building to make way for Big Dig construction.

In 1986 a local designer, AletA, had a fashion show at The Channel presenting fashion lines by both her and another designer, Lady B. Having a fashion-related show presented at this venue was controversial in subject matter, yet fit perfectly, as its format was that of a fashion-musical which was funky and progressive. Rather than displaying the clothing via runway presentation, the designs were shown through skits, with the music and clothing co-mingled together and choreographed, by Earl Boston, into telling a story. The stories being told, enacted lyrics of songs dropped on the Purple Rain (album), by Prince (musician). The Show opened with an elaborate display of colorful, sequined garments gyrating to the song, Baby I'm A Star, by Prince (musician) and kept the same momentum until the show closed in presenting a romantic video-production enacted to Hello (Lionel Richie song), by Lionel Richie. This original Fashion-Musical, by Pisces Design Studios, was the only exception to the Rock music format of this venue. The style of this show was unique to this designer's brand, and no other show of its fashion-nature was ever presented at The Channel thereafter.

In the mid- to late 1980s, the club was in its prime. Local up-and-coming Boston bands relished the opportunity to make it to this stage and plug in. David Tedeschi and Peter Vernaglia installed the original sound system at The Channel.  Tedeschi would leave about a year later to pursue other interests and Vernaglia would remain as lead engineer.  House soundmen included Rocky Marsiano, Norman Cook and Leonard Rosengard Vernaglia and crew would remain at the club for some eight years, following which soundman Dinky Dawson would install and maintain a new sound system for The Channel. He had settled in Boston from his native England, where he had made a name for himself in the 1960s and 1970s from his road work with bands like Fleetwood Mac, The Byrds, The Kinks to name but a few. Many of these old acquaintances like Mick Fleetwood or John McVie were seen milling about The Channel visiting with Dinky on the occasion that they were in Boston. The sound system that Dinky owned and brought with him to The Channel was rumored to include the same sound cabinets that first blasted Manfred Mann's "Doo Wa Diddy" in a recording studio back in London in 1964. Dinky's past is documented in the book Life on the Road published by Billboard Books in 1998.

Notable DJs
Hugh Munoz was one of the club's first full-time DJs and also hosted a show called Metrowave at WERS-FM. Many popular Boston DJs would also spin on special occasions including Carter Alan, Albert O, Tami Heide, Bradley Jay, and Peter Choyce. Debbie Southwood-Smith, Mike Idlis and Mod Todd (Todd Nichols/WGIR-FM) ushered in the mid to late eighties' era along with BCN's Metal Mike, DJ "Black Starliner" and Jim Mitchell. Also included in this category of Channel deejays are Carmelita (WBCN, WAAF) and Janet Planet (circa 1983–1987), who also worked the Nu Musik Nights, Shred (WERS, WBCN) and Hugh Munoz (1980-1983), creator of Metrowave on WERS.

Environment
The Channel had a legal capacity of 1,700, although management often oversold the venue for major acts. Upon entering the club, the patron faced a large raised wooden corral that provided a view of the stage from the far end. The look of the venue was that of the classic roadhouse. The 4' high stage faced a 20' square sunken dance floor, nicknamed "the pit", which was surrounded by drink rails and tables with padded stools. For punk rock and metal shows, the management locked this furniture up in the coat room. When the bands were playing and the crowd was jumping, the entire wooden floor often bounced up and down, causing the 15' high PA system, to sway precariously back and forth.

In addition to a dozen bar stations, the club had a concession stand/store ran by Doug Abbott that sold hot dogs, candy, soda, and popcorn, as well as official club merchandise (T-shirts, jackets, sweatpants, etc.). Directly behind that was a semi-private game room with a half dozen video games.

There was also a back bar area that had the ability to be closed off during all-ages shows by lowering metal grates over the window openings. All ingress/egress was restricted to a single door that was manned by a bouncer who checked for hand stamps to allow the over 21 crowds to enter for a drink, as well as prevent them from bringing alcoholic beverages out into the rest of the club with the underage crowd.

To the rear of the back bar area was yet another, smaller room that was usually closed off on nights when the club wasn't sold out. This was known as the VIP room, and regularly played host to artists like Jimmy Page, U2 and Aerosmith when they were in town and wanted a private place to sit with friends and have a few drinks.

Depending on who was playing, the pit would become a mass of sweaty skinheads, punks, metalheads, goth kids and the occasional hippie slamming into each other. In the late 1980s, shows would be stopped because kids were getting too violent. The bouncers had a notorious reputation of brutality, and there certainly were a number of incidents where this was the case.

Music
The Channel started out booking new wave bands such as Human Sexual Response, Jon Butcher Axis, and The Cars. During the early and mid-1980s heyday of hardcore and punk, bands like Hüsker Dü, Black Flag, Dead Kennedys and Minor Threat were headline acts. Later, local bands such as The Pixies played alongside major touring acts such as Big Audio Dynamite, Los Lobos, The Damned, and Einstürzende Neubauten.

The Channel was booked by Warren Scott from 1980 to 1991, and was not limited to punk/metal bands. The Godfather of Soul, James Brown played there, as did jazz legend Ornette Coleman. Classic shows of note have included Jerry Lee Lewis, Gregg Allman, Eric Burdon, Meat Loaf, The Go-Go's, The B-52's, Aztec Two-Step and Steppenwolf. Live radio station broadcasts also packed in large crowds. Often, the Channel became the first or last stop for many major tours.

The club also regularly booked reggae shows featuring acts such as Yellowman, Dennis Brown, Steel Pulse, Toots & the Maytals, Burning Spear, and Black Uhuru. Blues greats B.B. King, John Lee Hooker, Charlie Musselwhite, James Cotton, Junior Wells and Buddy Guy (as featured from 1989 as a bonus on the end of the 2007 DVD "Junior Wells Live At Nightstage"), Pinetop Perkins graced the stage on more than one occasion.

Notable acts

10,000 Maniacs
808 State
King Sunny Adé
Agnostic Front
Alice in Chains
GG Allin and the Jabbers
The Allstonians
Gregg Allman Band
 American Teen 
Angry Samoans
Angry Young Bees
Anthrax

Armored Saint
 Atlantic Phantom
 The Atlantics (a popular Boston local band)
Auditory Imagery
The B-52s
Backseat Driver
Bad Brains
Bad Manners
Bad Religion 
BANG
Johnny Barnes
Bastilē
Bauhaus
Bent Men 2
Better Than Ezra
Big Audio Dynamite
Big Black
Bim Skala Bim
Biohazard
Elvin Bishop
Black Crowes
Black Flag
Black Uhuru
Blake Babies
Alpha Blondy
Blue Öyster Cult
Bo Diddley
Bow Wow Wow
Boys Life
James Brown
The Bruisers
Bullet La Volta
Eric Burdon
Jon Butcher Axis
Butthole Surfers
Cancerous Growth
The Cars
Nick Cave and the Bad Seeds
Cavedogs
 Chapter Eleven
Childhood
The Circle Jerks
Clairvoyance
Clarence Clemons
Joe Cocker
Ornette Coleman Quartet & Prime Time
Commander Cody and the Lost Planet Airmen
Concrete Blonde
Johnny Copeland
James Cotton
Crabdaddy
The Cramps
The Cure
Dag Nasty
The Damned
Dangerous Birds
Danzig
The dB's
The Dead Boys
Dead Kennedys
The Dead Milkmen
Del Fuegos
Rick Derringer
Devo
The Divinyls
 Doug and the Slugs
The Dream Syndicate
Dr. John
Ian Dury and the Blockheads
DYS
Echo & the Bunnymen
Ed's Redeeming Qualities
Eddie Kendricks & David Ruffin
Einstürzende Neubauten
The English Beat
John Entwistle
Exodus
Extreme
The Exploited
Face to Face (new wave band)
Farrenheit
Fear
Fear of Falling
The Feelies
Ferrara
Fishbone
The Fixx
Flesh For Lulu
Flipper
A Flock of Seagulls
Foghat
Ellen Foley
The Fools 
Lita Ford
The Freeze
Fugazi
The F.U.'s
Gang Green
Gang of Four
Georgee
The Georgia Satellites
Gipsy Kings
Girls' Night Out
Gary Glitter
The Go-Gos
Gorilla Biscuits
Grandmaster Flash and the Furious Five
The Guess Who
The Gun Club
GWAR
Nina Hagen
Debbie Harry
Hoodoo Gurus
John Lee Hooker
Human Sexual Response
Ian Hunter (with Mick Ronson)
Hunters & Collectors
Hüsker Dü
Ice-T
The J. Geils Band
The Jam
Rick James
Tommy James
Jesus and Mary Chain
Jesus Chrysler
Jerry's Kids
Joan Jett and the Blackhearts
Steve Jones (Sex Pistols guitarist)
The Jordanaires
Jorma Kaukonen
Junkyard
Kid Creole and the Coconuts
Killing Joke
Kilslug
B.B. King
King Diamond
King's X
KMFDM
Robbie Krieger
L.A. Guns
LaPrad
Mark Lanegan
Dan Lawson and The Keep
Alvin Lee
Tabu Ley Rochereau
Limited Access
Living Color
Lizzie Borden & The Axes
Locomotive
The Lords of the New Church
Mad Hatter
Mass
Meat Loaf
Meliah Rage
The Memos
Metallica
Lou Miami & The Kozmetix
Midnight Oil
Mighty Mighty Bosstones
Ministry
Minor Threat
The Minutemen
The Misfits
Mission of Burma
Mojo Nixon
Mother Love Bone
Motörhead
Murphys Law
Naked Raygun
The Neats
The Neighborhoods
Nervous Eaters
New Order
Nig Heist
Nina Hagen
No Idea
The Nor'easters
November Group
Gary Numan
Roy Orbison
Opal
Outlaws
The Outlets
Overdrive
Overkill
Pantera
Joe Perry Project
Physical Graffiti
Pisces Design Studios
The Pixies
The Plasmatics
Iggy Pop
The Present
The Professionals
Prong
Public Image Limited
Psychic TV
Pylon
Quiet Riot
Bonnie Raitt
Ramones
Rare Earth
Red Hot Chili Peppers
Red Rockers
Redd Kross
The Replacements
The Residents
Rukkus
Rollins Band
The Romantics
Run-D.M.C.
Sam Black Church
Satan and Adam
Screaming Blue Messiahs
Samper Fi
September Reign
Sick of it All
Simple Minds
Sidewinders
Saxon
Self Image
The Service
Sheer Terror
The Sisters of Mercy
Skid Row
Slapshot
Slayer
Social Distortion (first Boston appearance)
Sonic Youth
The Speedies
Spinal Tap
SSD
Paul Stanley
Steel Pulse
Steppenwolf
Stiff Little Fingers
The Stompers
Stone Temple Pilots
Straw Dogs
Suicidal Tendencies
The Sweet
Stryper
Tesla
The The
The Thompson Twins
The Three O'Clock
Johnny Thunders
'Til Tuesday
The Titanics
Peter Tosh
Treat Her Right
Tribe
The Tubes
UB40
The Undertones
USA Decay
Vanilla Fudge
The Violent Femmes
The Young and the Useless
The Young Snakes
The Wailers
Toxic Narcotic
The Turbines
Type-O Negative
War
Wargasm
Warrant
Winger
Witch Bonnie
Junior Wells with Buddy Guy
Mary Wilson
Ronnie Wood
World Party
Steve Wynn
Wrecking Crew
Yellowman
Youth of Today
W.A.S.P.
The Charlie Watts Orchestra
White Lion
The Wipers
X
X-Plicit

References

External links
 The Channel in Myspace
 City of Boston's free walking tour of Fort Point
 bostonsbestliverock.com
 Marotta, Michael (August 1, 2016). "Report: Boston rock club The Channel to be honored at General Electric’s new Boston headquarters". Vanyaland.

Music venues in Boston
Former music venues in the United States
Demolished music venues in the United States
Cultural history of Boston
Nightclubs in Massachusetts
Punk rock venues
20th century in Boston
Drinking establishments in Boston
1980 establishments in Massachusetts
Music venues completed in 1980